Brian Pothier (born April 15, 1977) is an American former professional ice hockey defenseman. Pothier played in the National Hockey League (NHL) from 2000 until 2010.

Playing career
As a youth, Pothier played in the 1991 Quebec International Pee-Wee Hockey Tournament with a minor ice hockey team from Beverly, Massachusetts.

Undrafted to the NHL, Pothier played collegiate hockey with Rensselaer Polytechnic Institute. After his senior year he was signed as a free agent by the Atlanta Thrashers on March 27, 2000. After two seasons with the Thrashers he was moved to the Ottawa Senators prior to the 2002–03 season in a trade for Shawn McEachern, and was later signed by the Washington Capitals as a free agent in the summer of 2006.

On January 3, 2008, Pothier suffered a concussion, possibly when Boston Bruins right winger Milan Lucic hit him hard into the boards, resulting in the fourth reported concussion of his career, which sidelined him for the next fourteen months. Pothier later attributed his post-concussion symptoms and long recovery period to an undiagnosed astigmatism resulting from his latest concussion.  He stated that he had recovered from the concussion two to three months after the injury, but his astigmatism led to the symptoms previously thought to be post-concussion syndrome until it was properly diagnosed in December 2008.

On December 17, 2008, he practiced in full gear for the first time since the injury. On March 4, 2009, Pothier was assigned to the Capitals' American Hockey League affiliate, the Hershey Bears, for conditioning and to see if he experienced any post-concussion symptoms. Pothier was recalled to the Capitals, returning to the ice on March 16, 2009, fourteen months after the initial injury. He then scored his first goal since his injury on March 31, 2009, against the Tampa Bay Lightning.

On March 3, 2010, having registered 11 points in 41 games to that point in the 2009–10 season, Brian was traded along with prospect Oskar Osala to the Carolina Hurricanes in exchange for defenseman Joe Corvo.

On July 27, 2010, Pothier ended his North American career and signed a two-year contract with European team Genève-Servette HC of the Swiss National League A (NLA). After two seasons in Switzerland, Pothier signed a two-year contract extension to remain with Genève-Servette. However he was unable to take the ice, due to lingering concussion symptoms that ultimately ended his professional career.

While in his recovery and still of the intention to fulfill his contract obligation to Genève-Servette HC, Pothier served as a voluntary assistant coach with the University of Massachusetts at Dartmouth.

Career statistics

Regular season and playoffs

International

Awards and honors

Transactions
 March 27, 2000 – Signed as a free agent by the Atlanta Thrashers
 June 29, 2002 – Traded to the Ottawa Senators for Shawn McEachern and a sixth round selection in 2004.
 July 1, 2006 – Signed as a free agent by the Washington Capitals
 March 3, 2010 – Traded to the Carolina Hurricanes, along with Oskar Osala and second round selection in 2011 for Joe Corvo.

References

External links

1977 births
Living people
American men's ice hockey defensemen
Atlanta Thrashers players
Binghamton Senators players
Carolina Hurricanes players
Chicago Wolves players
Genève-Servette HC players
Hershey Bears players
Ice hockey players from Massachusetts
Orlando Solar Bears (IHL) players
Ottawa Senators players
People from New Bedford, Massachusetts
RPI Engineers men's ice hockey players
Undrafted National Hockey League players
Washington Capitals players
AHCA Division I men's ice hockey All-Americans